Lyudmyla (also transliterated as Liudmyla or Lyudmila) Mykhajlivna Panchuk (January 18, 1956 – February 18, 2011) was a Soviet Ukrainian team handball player who competed in the 1976 Summer Olympics.  In 1976 she won the gold medal with the Soviet team.

References

1956 births
2011 deaths
handball players at the 1976 Summer Olympics
medalists at the 1976 Summer Olympics
Olympic gold medalists for the Soviet Union
Olympic handball players of the Soviet Union
Olympic medalists in handball
Russian female handball players
Soviet female handball players
Ukrainian female handball players